Platysace is a genus of woody perennial herbs and subshrubs in the family Apiaceae. The genus is endemic to Australia.

Taxonomy
The genus was first described by Alexander von Bunge in 1845. A 2021 molecular phylogenetic study suggested that it is sister to rest of the family Apiaceae, and so does not belong to any of the four subfamilies into which the family is divided. It has been suggested that it could be placed in a subfamily of its own.

Species
Species include:
Platysace anceps (DC) C. Norman
Platysace arnhemica Specht 
Platysace cirrosa Bunge (karna)  
Platysace clelandii (Maiden & Betche) L. A. S. Johnson  
Platysace commutata (Turcz) C. Norman   
Platysace compressa (Labill) C. Norman (tapeworm plant)
Platysace deflexa (Turcz) C. Norman 
Platysace dissecta (Benth) C. Norman (dissected platysace)
Platysace eatoniae (F. Muell) C. Norman   
Platysace effusa (Turcz) C. Norman 
Platysace ericoides (Spreng) C. Norman    Platysace filiformis (Bunge) C. Norman   Platysace flexuosa Turcz)  Platysace haplosciadia (Benth) C. Norman Platysace heterophylla (Benth) C. NormanPlatysace juncea (Bunge) C. Norman Platysace kochii L. A. S. Johnson  Platysace lanceolata (Labill) Druce  (shrubby platysace)     Platysace linearifolia (Cav) C. Norman Platysace maxwellii (F. Muell) C. Norman (karno)  Platysace pendula (Benth) C. NormanPlatysace ramosissima (Benth) C. NormanPlatysace saxatilis KeigheryPlatysace stephensonii (Turcz) C. Norman Platysace tenuissima (Benth) C. Norman   Platysace teres (Bunge) C. Norman  Platysace valida (F. Muell) F. MuellPlatysace xerophila'' L. A. S. Johnson

References

External links
 Western Australian Flora

 
Apiaceae genera
Taxa named by Alexander von Bunge